The Famous Flower of Serving-Men or The Lady turned Serving-Man (Child 106, Roud 199) is a traditional English language folk song and murder ballad. Child considered it as closely related to the ballad "The Lament of the Border Widow" or "The Border Widow's Lament"."Unusually, it is possible to give a precise date and authorship to this ballad. It was written by the prolific balladeer, Laurence Price, and published in July 1656, under the title of The famous Flower of Serving-Men. Or, The Lady turn'd Serving-Man. It lasted in the mouths of ordinary people for three hundred years: what a tribute to the work of any writer, leave alone the obscure Laurence Price. Oral tradition, however, has made changes. The original has twenty-eight verses and a fairy-tale ending: “And then for fear of further strife, / he took Sweet William to be his Wife: / The like before was never seen, / A Serving-man to be a Queen”.

- Roy Palmer, A Book of British Ballads

Lyrics 
Below are the first few verses of Laurence Price's 1656 lyrics with Martin Carthy's adapted lyrics in brackets:My mother showd me a deadly spight; (My mother did me deadly spite)

She sent three thieves at darksome night; (For she sent thieves in the dark of night)

They put my servants all to flight, (Put my servants all to flight)

They robd my bower, and they slew my knight. (They robbed my bower they slew my knight)

They could not do me much more harm, (They couldn't do to me no harm)

But they slew my baby on my arm; (So they slew my baby in my arm)

They left me nothing to wrap it in (Left me naught to wrap him in)

But the bloody, bloody sheet that it lay in. (But the bloody sheet that he lay in)

They left me nothing to make a grave (They left me naught to dig his grave)

But the bloody sword that slew my babe; (But the bloody sword that slew my babe)

All alone the grave I made, (All alone the grave I made)

And all alone salt tears I shed. (And all alone the tears I shed)

All alone the bell I rung, (And all alone the bell I rang)

And all alone sweet psalms I sung; (And all alone the psalm I sang)

I leant my head against a block, (I leaned my head all against a block)

And there I cut my lovely locks. (And there I cut my lovely locks)

I cut my locks, and chang'd my name (I cut my locks and I changed my name)

From Fair Eleanore to Sweet William. (From Fair Eleanor to Sweet William)

Synopsis
A woman's husband and child are killed by agents of her mother (or, sometimes, stepmother). The woman buries them, cuts her hair, changes her name from "Fair Elise" or "Fair Elinor" to "Sweet William", and goes to the king's court to become his servant.  She serves him well enough to become his chamberlain.

The song variants split, sharply, at this point. The common variant has the king going to hunt and being led into the forest by a white hind. The king reaches a clearing and the hind vanishes. A bird, the personification of the woman's dead husband, then appears and laments what has happened to his love. The king asks, and the bird tells the story. The king returns and kisses his chamberlain, still dressed as a man, to the shock of the assembled court. In many versions the woman's mother/stepmother is then executed, possibly by burning, and usually the king marries the woman.

In some versions the king goes hunting, and the woman laments her fate, but is overheard; when the king is told it, he marries her.

In The Border Widow's Lament, the woman laments, in very similar verses, the murder of her husband by the king; she buries him and declares she will never love another.

Field Recordings 

 Martha Reid, of Blairgowrie, Perthshire, Scotland, was recorded by Maurice Fleming in 1955.
 Caroline Hughes of Blandford, Dorset sang the song to Peter Kennedy in 1968.
 Mary Delaney sang a variant entitled My Brother Built for Me a Bancy Bower to Jim Carroll and Pat Mackenzie in Co. Tipperary somewhere between 1973 and 1985.

Martin Carthy
Martin Carthy's version is the most notable. For his 1972 album Shearwater, Carthy took the fragments and reworked the ballad, drawing on lines from other ballads. He set the piece to a tune used by Hedy West for the "Maid of Colchester." The song was featured twice on the BBC Radio 1 John Peel show - first on 14 August 1973 and again on 28 April 1975. In 2005 Carthy won the award for Best Traditional Track for "Famous Flower of Serving Men" at the BBC Radio 2 Folk Awards.

Other versions and cultural references 
Joseph Haydn arranged a version of the song in the 1790s, entitled "The Border Widow's Lament".

Bob Davenport sang The Border Widow's Lament in 1964 on the album Northumbrian Minstrelsy.

The Ian Campbell Folk Group sang Highland Widow's Lament in 1966 on their Transatlantic EP Four Highland Songs.

The Clutha sang The Border Widow's Lament in 1971 on their Argo album Scotia!.

The High Level Ranters sang The Border Widow's Lament in 1973 on their Trailer album A Mile to Ride.

Linda Adams sang The Lament of the Border Widow in 1975 on her and Paul Adams' album Far Over the Fell.

Ellen Kushner's novel Thomas the Rhymer (1990) includes elements of the song.

References

External links
 The Famous Flower of Serving Men
 The Famous Flower of Serving Men
 The Lady turned Serving-Man
 Steeleye Span version
 

Fictional servants
Child Ballads
Songs about cross-dressing
Murder ballads
Year of song unknown